In algebra, a Warfield group, studied by , is a summand of a simply presented abelian group.

References

Group theory